Twin Crater is a volcanic crater with twin nested cones that rises behind McMurdo Station and 0.5 nautical miles (0.9 km) west of Crater Hill on Hut Point Peninsula, Ross Island. This crater was named Middle Crater by Frank Debenham of the British Antarctic Expedition, 1910–13, apparently for its location in relation to First Crater and Crater Hill, but the name has fallen into disuse. Twin Crater, alluding to the nested cones in the crater, was applied as early as 1971 and the name has become established because of consistent use in current maps and reports. Black Knob, a big black rock outcrop lies 0.2 nautical miles (0.4 km) east of Twin Crater.

Volcanoes of Ross Island
Volcanic craters